The Men's 4 × 200 metre freestyle relay competition of the 2016 European Aquatics Championships was held on 21 May 2016.

Records
Prior to the competition, the existing world, European and championship records were as follows.

Results

Heats
The heats were held at 09:47.

Final
The final was held at 18:03.

References

Men's 4 x 200 metre freestyle relay